The Colchic nase or Transcaucasian nase (Chondrostoma colchicum) is a species of freshwater fish in the family Cyprinidae. Its distribution is south of the Caucasus, and it is reported from Russia, Armenia, Azerbaijan, Georgia and Turkey.

References 

 
 La lasca della Colchide, Chondrostoma colchicum Derjugin, 1899 www.ittiofauna.org

Chondrostoma
Fish described in 1899